Usta Muhammad railway station is  located in Usta Mohammad, Jafarabad District, Pakistan.

See also
 List of railway stations in Pakistan
 Pakistan Railways
 Usta Mohammad

References

External links

Railway stations in Jafarabad District
Railway stations on Larkana–Jacobabad line